"Ring Out Your Dead" is the second episode of the fifth series of Midsomer Murders and the twentieth episode overall. It stars John Nettles as Detective Chief Inspector Tom Barnaby and Daniel Casey as Detective Sergeant Gavin Troy.

Synopsis
The Midsomer Wellow bell-ringing band is stalked by an elusive serial killer on the eve of a major tournament. A cute new member distracts some of the bell ringers of Midsomer Wellow from concentrating on the upcoming striking competition, but they still manage to place a group bet on a horse called Ring-A-Ding, which wins them 30,000 pounds. This combination of gambling and church bell ringing enrages some portions of the village. When one of the ringers is found in the tower, shot through the heart and clutching the ironic words "Ding Dong Bell", Barnaby isn't amused. As another murder takes place, Chief Inspector Barnaby wonders if he should be looking for a maniac, or the rather more rational nemesis of a rival team.

Murders
Throughout the episode, there are 4 murders, one of which is historical.  There is also a death by natural causes.
Greg Tutt: Lured to his death by a letter supposedly from another character asking to meet at the bell tower, then shot through the heart.
Emma Tysoe: Shot through the heart on the day of her wedding.
Marcus Steadman: Fears that he is being followed which brings on a panic attack, inflaming his asthma. After collapsing on a footbridge he is then pushed in a river with a walking stick, where he subsequently drowns.
The Reverend Jonathan Ebbrel : This murder takes place in 1860. The legend goes that the bellringers murdered him and hid his body in a well because he imposed strict rules on the bell ringers.

Other deaths
Reggie Barton: Dies of natural causes in his sleep.

Midsomer Murders episodes
2002 British television episodes